A strip parish is a parish with a narrow, elongated shape, typically formed during the Anglo-Saxon and early medieval period. The shape is influenced by landscape, political and economic factors. Evidence of such parishes can be found throughout England, although they appear to have been more common in a number of southern counties, particularly but not exclusively associated with locations encompassing both lowland and upland landscapes or alternatively coastal communities.

Origins of strip parishes
A number of common factors influenced the creation of strip parishes: the establishment of the parish unit, the topography of the landscape and the scarcity of valuable resources.

The fragmentation of hundreds in England during the 8th and 9th centuries, due to the split up of larger estates and the transfer of land, progressively resulted in the emergence of smaller manorial estates. One of the most important contributions to this process was the endowment of lands associated with the establishment of churches and their accompanying estate, the patronage of the lower levels of nobility and the legal inheritance of land within families. Accelerated by the arrival of Norman rule all these factors paved the way for simultaneous creation of the patchwork of parish units and formalisation of their administrative boundaries alongside the re-assembling of manorial lands.

In locations such as the Chilterns, South Downs and coastal areas of Devon and Cornwall where there was a limit of important resources, a further development of the parish system can be observed. For example, in Buckinghamshire and Oxfordshire settlements established in the lowland areas of the Vale of Aylesbury and Thames Valley respectively, along the base of the Chiltern Hills, extended their territories by accumulating territory on the largely uninhabited hillside, scarp and hilltop areas to exploit scarce resources such as woodland and upland summer pasture also known as transhumance. The result of this land reorganisation produced estates and parishes, which were narrow elongated strips exhibiting a range of land types, ensuring the widest possible availability of resources.

Development of autonomous manors and parishes
Subsequent expansion of the temporary summer settlements led to the establishment of permanent communities, including the formation of autonomous manors or hamlets with their own, initially modest chapels-of-ease, which later became fully-fledged churches. Where topography was not favourable to the expansion uphill to create a parish comprising one continuous strip, a detached area of upland territory was acquired. For example, Marsworth and its detached manor of Hawridge. Normally, such detached land was within the same hundred and county but occasionally, as in Tring, Hertfordshire and its detached upland hamlet Coleshill several miles away and in Buckinghamshire such detached communities can span across county boundaries.

As early as the latter period of the Middle Ages and as late as the 20th century, some of these ‘daughter’ communities became permanently detached from their longer established parent village many miles away. In some cases the split resulted eventually in the creation of two and occasionally several separate hamlets.

The consequence of the splitting off of the upland communities was often the relocation of the lowland community to a new village location. In other cases, the upland communities have become parishes in their own right or have amalgamated with other hilltop villages to also create a distinct parish.

A detailed account of the development of strip parishes in the Chilterns can be found in The Chilterns by Leslie Hepple and Alison Doggett.

Detached Hamlets
The Parishes of Westerham, Brasted, and Sundridge in the Vale of Holmesdale, North West Kent are examples of strip parishes that are large enough to have a detached hamlet. Chartwell is the detached hamlet of Westerham; Brasted Chart is the detached hamlet for Brasted, and Ide Hill is the detached hamlet for Sundridge.

Geological Features
The geological structure of the underlying rock found in the strip parish can sometimes be indicated by the variety of local rock used in the construction of the parish church. Examples of this are Westerham and Brasted where the following rocks can be found within the parish church building: sandstone, Melbourne rock (hard chalk), flint, chert.

Details of the particular local geology can be found in local geological maps, for example the rocks cited above are indicated on the Dartford geological survey.

Agricultural Influences
The combination of soils that form as a result of this variety of underlying bedrock promotes prosperity in the farming of the area because it allows many different types of agriculture in a small area: alluvium (holding water, promoting lush pastures for feeding cattle), chalk (well drained, dry for sheep), sandstone ridge (infertile, but still suitable for woodland to provide charcoal and fuel for cooking and warmth).

The benefits can be enhanced if the local land profile is sufficiently sloping because the washdown from the valley sides transports the base minerals to the shelter of the valley where they are mixed to form a fertile soil suitable for growing cereals, root crops, cash crops.

List of strip parishes in England

Further reading

Civil parishes in England
Types of subdivision in the United Kingdom
Rural geography